Drupella cornus, common name : the horn drupe,  is a species of sea snail, a marine gastropod mollusk in the family Muricidae, the murex snails or rock snails.

Description
The shell size of an adult varies between 28 mm and 40 mm. This whitish shell shows four rows of spiny, pointed nodules with numerous smaller spines between. The oval aperture is yellow. The outer lip is with three to four teeth.

Drupella cornus lays benthic  egg capsules, which  hatch  into  free-swimming planktonic veliger larvae 

Drupella cornus is a predator of living coral, grazing on the coral tissue. An abundance of this snail can cause significant destruction to the hard-coral cover on reefs. There is a possible link between coral diseases and an outbreak of this snail. The snail is attracted to Montipora corals when these corals secrete montiporic acids

Habitat
Drupella cornus commonly occurs on or under tabular corals of  the genera Acropora and Montipora or on hard substrates in the lower intertidal zone and shallow sublittoral zone. In areas where Acropora and Montipora coral are rare, D. Cornus has also been known to feed on other corals such as Porites in Kenya, and Pocillopora and Porites in Hawaii.

Distribution
This species is distributed in the Red Sea and in the Indian Ocean along Aldabra, Chagos, Kenya, Madagascar, the Mascarene Basin, Mozambique, Tanzania, KwaZuluNatal, Gulf of Thailand, Japan, and the Indo-Pacific.

References

 Spry, J.F. (1961). The sea shells of Dar es Salaam: Gastropods. Tanganyika Notes and Records 56
 Drivas, J. & M. Jay (1988). Coquillages de La Réunion et de l'île Maurice

External links
 

Drupella
Gastropods described in 1798